is a Japanese light novel series written by Kinosuke Naito and illustrated by Yasumo. It has been published online via the user-generated novel publishing website Shōsetsuka ni Narō since December 2016. It was later acquired by Enterbrain, who has released fourteen volumes since October 2017.

A manga adaptation illustrated by Yasuyuki Tsurugi has been serialized in Fujimi Shobo's shōnen manga magazine Monthly Dragon Age since November 2017, with its chapters collected into ten tankōbon volumes as of January 2023. An anime television series adaptation by Zero-G premiered in January 2023.

Plot
Hiraku dies purely by accident due to a God not giving him good luck, so he reincarnated him in another world as an apology; even turning a holy artifact into a multi-purpose tool for him. This new life for Hiraku ends up becoming quite odd, slowly building a community and village of differing species; with him serving as their mayor.

Characters 

He is the main protagonist. While starting out on his own, Hiraku ends up befriending wolves he named  Kuro and Yuki, and the demon spider he named Zabuton, and even accepting humanoid species into his settlement. To some of his confusion, Hiraku ends up with a harem with at least seven wives and children, though some of the elves have children with him solely for continuing their bloodline.

A magic-using female vampire who has an interest in growing medicinal plants. Her size changes with the loss and intake of blood. She is Hiraku's first wife and the mother of their son Alfred.

A female angel and frenemy of Ru. She gives birth to Hiraku's first daughter, who is an angel like her mother; angels are a mono-sexed race.  She brought with her the farm's first chickens, as well as the infamous Three Killer Angels and some Lizardmen.

The leader of a group of high-elf girls. Their village was destroyed by humans in a war 200 years ago, and they've been wandering homeless ever since until Tia brought them to Hiraku's farm. They contribute to the farm by establishing a smithy to make metal tools and weapons, and bringing other technologies such as building construction and baking.

She acts as the representative of the ogre maids who came to reside in the village with Flora.

One of the ogre maids who became the village's housing manager.

Ru's sister and a researcher where her interest is in the fermentation process made her move to the village. She brought to the farm its first two heads of cattle.

Leader of the Beastmen who came to live in the village.

The leader of elder dwarves who brought to the village the distillation process.  He and his group later became the village's resident brewers.

The daughter of the Great Dragon King Dryme (voiced by Tetsu Inada) asked by her mother Graffaloon (voiced by Yoko Hikasa) to stay in the village as a diplomat. She later becomes in-charge of the village's diplomatic relations.

She is sent by her father, the Demon General Beezel (voiced by Yōji Ueda), to spy on the village's "military might." She ends up staying much longer after seeing what it really is and what its human mayor is capable of doing.  She later became the village's accountant.

Dryme's older sister who ends up becoming the village schoolteacher after stirring some trouble in the village.

The daughter of the Demon King Galgardo (voiced by Hozumi Goda) who sent an army of 300 to the Taiju Village to rescue Flowrem, not knowing her real status there after being fed ideas by her three stupid noble friends.

Three noble girls who fed Princess Yuri half-truths about the village, leading to its foiled invasion. They stayed behind as Flowrem's village hall assistants (now referred to as the "Town Hall Girls").

The leader of a group of mountain elves who came to the village to stay. She in particular knows where to find the best clay for Hiraku's earthenware.

Media

Light novels
Written by Kinosuke Naito, Farming Life in Another World began publication online via the user-generated novel publishing website Shōsetsuka ni Narō on December 29, 2016. The series was later acquired by Enterbrain, who began publishing the novels with illustrations by Yasumo on October 30, 2017. As of December 28, 2022, fourteen volumes have been released.

Manga
A manga adaptation illustrated by Yasuyuki Tsurugi initially began serialization online via Kadokawa's ComicWalker website on October 12, 2017. It later began serialization in Fujimi Shobo's shōnen manga magazine Monthly Dragon Age on November 9 of that year. As of January 2023, ten tankōbon volumes have been released. In North America, the manga is licensed by One Peace Books in print and digital format.

A spin-off four-panel manga, titled , began serialization in Monthly Dragon Age on July 8, 2022. The first volume was published on January 7, 2023.

Anime
An anime adaptation was announced on March 29, 2022. It was later revealed to be a television series produced by Zero-G and directed by Ryōichi Kuraya, with scripts written by Touko Machida, character designs handled by Yoshiko Saitō, who also serves as chief animation director, and music composed by Yasuharu Takanashi and Johannes Nilsson. The series premiered on January 6, 2023, on AT-X and other networks. The opening theme song is "Flower Ring" by Shino Shimoji and Aya Suzaki, while the ending theme song is "Feel the winds" by VTuber Hizuki Yui. Sentai Filmworks licensed the series, and will be streaming it on Hidive.

See also
 Banished from the Hero's Party – Another light novel illustrated by Yasumo

Notes

References

External links
  at Shōsetsuka ni Narō 
  
  
  
 

2017 Japanese novels
2023 anime television series debuts
Agriculture and farming in anime and manga
Anime and manga based on light novels
Enterbrain
Fantasy anime and manga
Fiction about reincarnation
Fujimi Shobo manga
Isekai anime and manga
Isekai novels and light novels
Japanese fantasy novels
Kadokawa Dwango franchises
Light novels
Light novels first published online
Sentai Filmworks
Shōnen manga
Shōsetsuka ni Narō
Yonkoma
Zero-G (studio)